In phonetics and phonology, a uvular stop is a type of consonantal sound, made with the back of the tongue in contact with the uvula, which hangs down in front of the throat (hence uvular), held tightly enough to block the passage of air (hence a stop consonant).

Uvular stops are acoustically similar to but less common than the velar stops (e.g.  and ), and do not occur in English.  Uvular stops are common in certain parts of the world, e.g. the Caucasian languages and the Pacific Northwest languages of North America.  However, they are unattested in the European languages (outside of a few peripheral areas such as the Caucasus).

The most common sound is the voiceless stop .  This sound is well known in Arabic, and occurs (at least in Standard Arabic) in words such as Quran (Koran), Qatar, and Al-Qahira (Arabic for Cairo).  More generally, several kinds are distinguished:

 , voiceless uvular plosive
 , voiced uvular plosive
 , uvular nasal
 , uvular ejective
 , voiced uvular implosive (very rare)
  or  voiceless uvular implosive (claimed to exist in Kaqchikel)

Uvular consonants
Plosives